Splendens Ceptigera ("Splendid ruler") is a monodic song (fol. 21v-22) from the Llibre Vermell de Montserrat, one of the oldest extant medieval manuscripts containing music. In modern times it has been recorded by many artists:

 Jordi Savall, Hespèrion XX (album Llibre Vermell de Montserrat - siglo XIV, 1978)
 New London Consort directed by Philip Pickett (album Llibre vermell, pilgrim songs & dances, 1992)
 Ensemble Anonymus (album Llibre vermell, 1993)
 Gothart (album Stella splendens, 1997)
 Studio der Frühen Musik directed by Thomas Binkley (album Secular music c1300, 1998)
 Companyia Elèctrica Dharma (album Llibre Vermell, 2002)
 Choeur de Chambre de Namur (album Llibre Vermell, 2007)

References 

Medieval compositions